Elizabeth Ferrers (c. 1250 – c. 1300) was a daughter of William de Ferrers, 5th Earl of Derby, and his second wife Margaret de Quincy (born 1218). Her maternal grandparents were Roger de Quincy, 2nd Earl of Winchester, and Helen of Galloway.

Elizabeth was married first to William Marshal, 2nd Baron Marshal, and after his death to Dafydd ap Gruffydd, a prince of Gwynedd and brother of Llywelyn ap Gruffudd.  Dafydd was at that time in favour with King Edward I of England, but later rebelled and was executed in 1283. Elizabeth's fate is not known for certain, but she is thought to have been buried at the parish church in Caerwys, north Wales, where local tradition identifies a stone effigy on display in the church as hers.

Elizabeth's daughter Gwladys was sent to Sixhills convent for the rest of her life. Her husband Dafydd is thought to have had other daughters who may have been illegitimate. Her sons Llywelyn and Owain were imprisoned and never released.

References

1250s births
1300s deaths
Daughters of British earls
14th-century English people
14th-century English women
13th-century English people
13th-century English women